Ioannis Amanatidis (born 3 December 1981) is a Greek football manager and former player. As a player, Amanatidis played as a striker and winger, and was active professionally in Germany. He also represented Greece at senior international level.

Club career
Amanatidis was born in Kozani, Greece. His family immigrated when he was nine years old to Stuttgart where he joined SC Stuttgart. Two years later he went to VfB Stuttgart academy. In 2002, he started his Bundesliga career having already played on loan for Greuther Fürth in lower divisions. After a clash with then VfB Stuttgart coach Felix Magath over his lack of opportunities he was given on loan to struggling Bundesliga side Eintracht Frankfurt where he impressed despite the eventual relegation of the team to second division.

In the summer he signed on free to 1. FC Kaiserslautern, but after only one season he signed again to the newly promoted Eintracht Frankfurt side and has been instrumental in the team's attack ever since scoring regularly and eventually becoming the captain of the team since the 2007–08 season.

In April 2008, it was reported that the captain of Eintracht has agreed to an extension of his contract till 2012 with the club.

On 18 July 2011, Amanatidis officially announced his retirement from professional football. He finished his career having 325 appearances (98 goals, 24 assists) in all competitions.

International career
Amanatidis earned his first cap for Greece against the Republic of Ireland in November 2002. However, he was left out of the victorious Euro 2004 squad.

He was selected in the final squad for the 2005 FIFA Confederations Cup and featured in the matches against Brazil and Mexico.

On 9 August 2010, Amanatidis decided to retire from international football. He stated, that "there are many strange and suspicious choices, some players are always in the starting eleven and many of us know the reasons of the selection, but if I say more, there are going to be many reactions.", Amanatidis stated.

Amanatidis' career high with the national team was his winning goal against Turkey in Istanbul in a highly passionate game. He was also selected in the final squad for the Euro 2008 finals and featured in all the matches, against Sweden, Spain and Russia.

Coaching career
After his retirement from football, in 2014, Amanatidis joined Iraklis U20 as a reserve team head coach. In October 2016, he acted as caretaker manager of the first team. On 15 January 2019, Amanatidis was presented as the new assistant manager of Swiss Super League side FC St. Gallen. On 3 August 2020, he was presented as Abel Ferreira's new assistant manager at PAOK.

International goals

Honours
VfB Stuttgart
UEFA Intertoto Cup: 2002

Eintracht Frankfurt
 DFB-Pokal runner-up: 2005–06

References

External links
  
 Ioannis Amanatidis at eintracht-archiv.de 

1981 births
Living people
Footballers from Kozani
Greek emigrants to Germany
Association football forwards
Greek footballers
Greek football managers
Greek expatriate football managers
Expatriate footballers in Germany
Greece international footballers
Greece under-21 international footballers
Greek expatriate footballers
2005 FIFA Confederations Cup players
UEFA Euro 2008 players
Eintracht Frankfurt players
VfB Stuttgart players
VfB Stuttgart II players
SpVgg Greuther Fürth players
1. FC Kaiserslautern players
Bundesliga players
2. Bundesliga players
Iraklis Thessaloniki F.C. managers